Bruce Baum (born March 18, 1951) is an American comedian. His live act consists of prop comedy as well as more traditional stand-up material. One of his best-known stand-up routines is his diaper-wearing Babyman character. Baum is recognized for his large mustache, long hair and remarkable resemblance to musician David Crosby. Baum and comedian Barry Marder co-authored the first three Letters From a Nut books, written under the pseudonym Ted L. Nancy.

Biography
Baum was a football player at UCLA, but transferred to the University of California-Davis to receive more playing time. At UC-Davis, he earned a degree in political science while performing impromptu comedy routines in the school library and food commons. Bruce was also a very talented singer/songwriter while at UC-Davis playing small clubs in and around the Sacramento area. He returned to UCLA to earn a master's degree in film, and while working on film school projects, became friends with comedians such as Garry Shandling, Robin Williams, and Bob Saget. He joined the stand-up circuit in 1977. He also appeared frequently on the 1979-80 revival of the TV game show Make Me Laugh.

In 1981, Baum, billed as Bruce "Baby Man" Baum, recorded the comedy song "Marty Feldman Eyes", a parody of the Kim Carnes hit "Bette Davis Eyes".

From 1983 to 1984, Baum appeared several times as a panelist on Match Game-Hollywood Squares Hour. In 1986, he appeared with Dallas stars Jenilee Harrison and Audrey Landers on Super Password with Bert Convy.

Baum has appeared in several television programs since the early 1980s, including The Stockard Channing Show, Growing Pains, Full House, and Northern Exposure. He also appeared as an animated version of himself on The Simpsons, guest-starring with Jay Leno, Janeane Garofalo, Steven Wright, and Bobcat Goldthwait in the episode "The Last Temptation of Krusty".

Notes

External links
Bruce Baum.com

1951 births
Living people
American stand-up comedians
University of California, Davis alumni
UC Davis Aggies football players
American Jews
UCLA Film School alumni